John of Nully ( or Nully) was a French knight from Nully became the first Baron of Passavant in the Principality of Achaea. The date of his death is unknown.

Life 
John of Nully is generally supposed to have been the son of Vilain of Nully, a native of Nully and close friend of the historian Geoffrey of Villehardouin. John did not take the cross until 1218, and arrived in the Peloponnese probably not until 1220. There he established the fortress of Passavant or Passava—a corruption of "passe avant", probably either a war-cry or the Nully family motto, however it is also found as a toponym in northeastern France—on the mountains between the Mani peninsula and the plain of Laconia. The castle became the seat of the Barony of Passavant, with four knight's fiefs. It was militarily important, since it kept watch over the unruly Maniots and the Slavic inhabitants of Mount Taygetos, and Nully was named hereditary marshal of Achaea.

The historian Karl Hopf hypothesized that John was followed by another baron of the same name, John II, but this conjecture was rejected by Antoine Bon. John of Nully married a sister of Walter of Rosières, the Baron of Akova, and had a single daughter: Margaret of Passavant, the common heiress to both Passavant and Akova. Margaret was sent to Constantinople as a hostage, however, and by the time she returned to the Peloponnese in ca. 1275, Passavant had fallen and Akova had been confiscated. She was able only to reclaim a third of Akova after a long legal process.

References

Sources
 
 

Barons of the Principality of Achaea
Marshals of the Principality of Achaea
13th-century French people
People from Haute-Marne
Medieval Laconia